The Original Spinners (released in the UK as The Detroit Spinners) is the 1967 debut album by The Spinners for Motown Records. The LP includes the group's earliest singles on the label (such as Top 20 R&B hits "I'll Always Love You" and "Truly Yours"), as well as their first ever single "That's What Girls Are Made For" (which was released on the already defunct Tri-Phi Record label). None of the group's other material from Tri-Phi appear on this album.

The lineup on the cover features Bobby Smith, Edgar "Chico" Edwards, Henry Fambrough, Billy Henderson, and Pervis Jackson. Former member George Dixon (who is not pictured on the album because of his departure back in 1963) actually only appears on "That's What Girls Are Made For", The other tracks all feature Edwards. This is both Dixon's and Edwards' only appearance on an Spinners studio album (Edwards would leave the group soon after this production of this album was completed).

The album notes state that members Bobby Smith and Edgar "Chico" Edwards share most of the lead vocals on stage. However other than "Tomorrow May Never Come", where he does the lead vocal in unison with Smith (who also leads all the remaining tracks on this album) and Henry Fambrough, Edwards does not have any other leads on this album.

Track listing

Personnel
 Bobby Smith – lead and backing vocals
 Henry Fambrough – lead ("Tomorrow May Never Come") and backing vocals
 Billy Henderson – backing vocals
 Pervis Jackson – backing vocals
 Edgar "Chico" Edwards – lead ("Tomorrow May Never Come") and background vocals (all tracks except "That's What Girls Are Made For")
 George Dixon – backing vocals ("That's What Girls Are Made For" only)
 The Andantes (Jackie Hicks, Marlene Barrow, and Louvain Demps) – backing vocals (some tracks)
 Harvey Fuqua – producer, album producer
 Ivy Jo Hunter, William "Mickey" Stevenson – producer, album producer
 Berry Gordy, Jr. – producer
 Smokey Robinson – producer
 The Funk Brothers – instrumentation

Charts
Singles

References

External links
 

The Spinners (American group) albums
1967 debut albums
Motown albums
Albums produced by Harvey Fuqua
Albums produced by Johnny Bristol
Albums produced by Smokey Robinson
Albums produced by William "Mickey" Stevenson
Albums produced by Ivy Jo Hunter
Albums produced by Berry Gordy